Initiative 200 was a Washington state initiative to the Legislature promoted by California affirmative-action opponent Ward Connerly, and filed by Scott Smith and Tim Eyman. It sought to prohibit racial and gender preferences by state and local government. It was on the Washington ballot in November 1998 and passed with 58.22% of the vote. It added to Washington's law (but not its constitution) the following language:

Initiative 200 effectively curtailed any form of affirmative action in the state. In April 2019, the Washington Legislature passed Initiative 1000, ending the ban on affirmative action.  However, in November 2019, Referendum 88 blocked Initiative 1000 from going into effect.

Background 

In the late 1960s and early 1970s, as the civil rights movement came to an end, states nationwide developed policies as a form of remedy aimed to help mitigate the impact of institutionalized racism, sexism, etc. The policies were created to give special consideration to underrepresented minorities when state contracts and hiring where involved. In doing so the state believed that the availability of opportunities would help in the advancement of underrepresented minorities. Chapter 49.60 RCW, which prohibited discrimination against any person on basis of race, color, creed, national origin, family and marital statute, sex, age, or disability, was the standing Washington law prior to the enactment of Initiative 200, and had been upheld previously by courts and the Human Rights Commission. Included in the statute was a provision requiring state agencies access to affirmative action strategies to increase opportunities amongst racial minorities, including women, and veterans. State funded schools and universities were granted authority to establish their own entrance and admissions program with entrance requirements. The requirements outlined in the admission program must have complied with all federal laws prohibiting discrimination. Some universities had admissions policies in which the objective was to select students who had demonstrated capacity, high quality work, and who would contribute to a diverse student body.

Initiative 

Initiative 200, a Washington State statute enacted by direct public vote took place in November 1998. The voting took place statewide, with approximately 1.9 million voters taking to the polls. 58.2 percent, or a grand total of 1,099,410 voters supported the measure. Statewide, all counties passed the statute, with only one exception, King County, in all places but Seattle.

Following the initiative's passage, Washington Governor Gary Locke, who had opposed the initiative, issued a directive to guide state agencies in its implementation.  The governor's directive was criticized as "timid" by the free-market think tank Washington Policy Center.

Opposition and outcomes  
Proponents of I-200 said it was a step toward a "colorblind" society, a promise of the equality of merit and the limited role of government to make that so. However, opponents have noted that colorblind ideologies individualize conflicts and shortcomings, rather than examining the larger picture with cultural differences, stereotypes, and values placed into context. Among the outspoken opponents of the measure included former Governor Gary Locke. The Seattle Post-Intelligencer's Editorial Board also noted:

Opponents continue to point to the negative impact of I-200 on higher education, particularly in the face of the State's substantial growth of minority groups and the demand for an educated workforce. A draft report by the Higher Education Coordinating Board shows that Washington State African Americans, Hispanic and American Indian students "were not participating -- nor were they achieving academically -- at rates comparable to statewide averages." While I-200 was enacted, more than half of all American Indians who graduated from high school were college bound. In 2003, those numbers dropped to 38 percent.

In addition, opponents have criticized Tim Eyman, the Initiative's sponsor, for diverting campaign funds meant for several ballot initiatives he sponsored for personal use. In 2000 and 2001, it was discovered that Eyman diverted as much as $200,000 in campaign funds for several of his initiatives.

References

History of affirmative action in the United States
Government of Washington (state)
Opposition to affirmative action